In queueing theory, a discipline within the mathematical theory of probability, a Kelly network is a general multiclass queueing network. In the network each node is quasireversible and the network has a product-form stationary distribution, much like the single-class Jackson network.

The model is named after Frank Kelly who first introduced the model in 1975 in his paper Networks of Queues with Customers of Different Types.

References

Queueing theory